Dōzen Ueno (上野道善, 1939-present) is a Japanese Buddhist priest of the Kegon school. From 2007 to 2010, he served as the 219th head priest (bettō)  at Tōdai-ji. He currently presides as senior monk and is board chairman of the board of directors at Tōdaiji Gakuen.

References

1939 births
Japanese Buddhist clergy
Ryukoku University alumni
Living people